This was the first edition of the event.

Eric Korita and Rick Leach won in the final 6–7, 6–1, 7–5, against Ken Flach and Jim Grabb.

Seeds

  Kelly Jones /  Tim Pawsat (first round)
  Andy Kohlberg /  Robert Van't Hof (quarterfinals)
  Mike De Palmer /  Ben Testerman (first round)
  Glenn Michibata /  Brad Pearce (quarterfinals)

Draw

Draw

References

External links
 Draw

Seoul Open
1987 Grand Prix (tennis)
1987 Seoul Open